The 2022 Lima municipal election were held on 2 October 2022, following the convening of regional and municipal elections throughout Peru. Lima residents voted on a list of 40 candidates to replace incumbent Miguel Romero Sotelo when his term ends on 31 December 2022, alongside 39 member of the metropolitan council.

Electoral system 
The Metropolitan Municipality of Lima is the administrative and government body of the province of Lima. It is composed of the Metropolitan Mayor, the Provincial Council and the Metropolitan Assembly. The province of Lima is not circumscribed to any regional government in its condition of capital of Peru.

The election of the mayor and the council is carried out based on universal suffrage, which includes all national citizens over eighteen years of age, registered and resident in Lima and in full enjoyment of their political rights, as well as non-citizens nationals residing and registered in the province. There is no immediate reelection of the office of mayor.

The Provincial Council of Lima is made up of 39 councillors elected by direct suffrage for a period of four (4) years, jointly with the election of the Metropolitan Mayor. Voting is by closed list. Seats are allocated to the winning list according to the d'Hondt method or half plus one.

Lists

Rejected lists

Declined to run
 Richard Acuña – Alliance for Progress
 Ricardo Belmont – Free Peru
 Sergio Tejada – Together for Peru
 César Combina – Popular Force
 Edde Cuéllar – Popular Action
 Jorge Quintana – Popular Action
 Javier Combe – Popular Action
 Luis Enrique Gálvez – Popular Action
 Zenaida Solís – Purple Party

Opinion polls

Voting simulations

Electoral polls

Pre-electoral polls

Results

Metropolitan Municipality of Lima

Notes

References

Lima
Municipal elections in Peru
2022 elections in South America
2022 in Peru